Dunkelman may refer to:

Persons with the surname Dunkelman

Barbara Dunkelman (b. 1989), a Canadian voice actress and internet personality
Ben Dunkelman (1913–1997), a Canadian Jewish officer who served in the Canadian Army in World War II
Loretta Dunkelman (born 1934), American artist
Mark H. Dunkelman (b. 1947), a historian, artist and musician in Providence, Rhode Island

Objects

19694 Dunkelman, an asteroid